D'Eramo (or d'Eramo) is an Italian surname. Notable people with the surname include:

 Francis J. D'Eramo (1959–2009), American judge
 Luce d'Eramo (1925–2001), Italian writer and literary critic
 Michael D'Eramo (born 1999), Italian footballer

See also
Mirko Eramo

Italian-language surnames